Limonium arboreum is a species of sea lavender known by the common name tree limonium and siempreviva. It is endemic to the Canary Islands, where it is a plant of coastal habitat.

Description
This is a tough perennial herb growing from a woody rhizome. The thick leaves are oval in shape and up to about 30 centimeters long including the petioles, located in a basal rosette about the stem. The inflorescence is a stiff, branching panicle often exceeding a meter tall bearing large clusters of flowers. The flowers have lavender sepals and smaller white petals.

It is also known from coastal southern California, where it is a non-native landscaping escapee which can occasionally be seen growing around beaches and roadsides.

Mr George Penny of the Milford Nursery, was the first to cultivate of the Statice arborca in 1838 in the UK after it was sent from the Canary Islands. It had been sold originally for the high price of 25 guineas.

It was first published as Limonium arboreum in Fl. Medit. 22: 65 in 2012.

References

External links
Jepson Manual Treatment

arboreum
Endemic flora of the Canary Islands
Garden plants of Europe
Drought-tolerant plants